Nina Arvesen (born May 16, 1961) is an American actress of Norwegian extraction, model, dancer, and businesswoman. Best known for her performances in American soap operas, Arvesen landed her two most prominent acting roles as Cassandra Rawlins on The Young and the Restless and as Angela Raymond on the NBC television series Santa Barbara.

Career

Early life
Arvesen was born in White Plains, New York to Norwegian parents. Her father, Jan Arvesen, was a Norwegian diplomat and was Norway´s ambassador to Mexico (1979-1985), to Costa Rica (1985-1991) and to Portugal (1996-1998). Her mother, Sidsel  (pronounced "sis-sell") was an actress in Norway.  Arvensen has two brothers; Jannik Arvesen who is a financial investment adviser in Norway, and Christian Arversen who works in film and special effects in Los Angeles California.

Before working in the United States, Arvesen had her own talk show for three years in Norway and also worked as an actress in Egypt, Brazil, Costa Rica, Bermuda and Norway before moving back to the United States.

Career
Arvesen initially began her career during her teens as an actress, model, dancer and a classically trained pianist in Norway. After college, she made the decision to leave Norway in 1986 to pursue her dream of an acting career in the United States where she has appeared in several television shows, commercials and movies. According to Arvesen, American casting directors refused to accept her overseas acting credits. She eventually got her first U.S screen credit and Screen Actors Guild membership card after appearing in the 1987 movie Dragnet with Dan Aykroyd and Tom Hanks. After she stopped working in the various soap operas that made her famous, her career aspirations shifted from acting to work modeling for television commercials, print ads and popular magazines. Arvesen went on to launch and create her own production company, The Arvesen Group.

Soap Opera Digest called Arvesen one of "TV's Most Beautiful Women" in their March 21, 1989 publication, which had over 1 million subscribers at the time.

Arvesen currently owns and operates her own dance studio in California, after retiring from movies and television.

Charity work
Besides being the Master of Ceremonies of more than one St. Jude Children's Research Hospital's annual fund-raising events, Arvesen has been involved with the Make-A-Wish Foundation and the Juvenile Diabetes Research Foundation (JDRF).

Filmography

References

External links
 
 Nina Arvesen YouTube channel
 comprehensive Fan club page for Nina Arvesen

1961 births
Living people
People from White Plains, New York
American people of Norwegian descent
American soap opera actresses
American film actresses
School of American Ballet alumni
American television actresses
20th-century American actresses
21st-century American actresses